Lazu is a village in Khonsa Taluka of Tirap district of Arunachal Pradesh of India.

Its Postal Index Number code is 786630.

Yumsem Matey, member of Arunachal Pradesh Legislative Assembly belongs to this village.
Lazu is one huge village amongst the 13 villages(including Longkhong) of OLLO Community. The community of Ollo spreads across the border area of India and Mayangmar(Burma). Whereas, half of community leaves at Burma and Lazu area at India. Lazu EAC post holds the half of constituencies of 55th and 56th respectively.

References

Villages in Tirap district